The Symphony No. 3, S. 3 (K. 1A3), The Camp Meeting by Charles Ives (1874–1954) was written between 1908 and 1910. In 1947, the symphony was awarded the Pulitzer Prize for Music. Ives is reported to have given half the money to Lou Harrison, who conducted the premiere.

Structure
The symphony is in three movements:

This symphony is notable for its use of a chamber orchestra, rather than the complete orchestra Ives used for his other symphonies. The symphony is also rather short, lasting approximately twenty minutes.

Instrumentation
The symphony is scored for a chamber orchestra of a flute, oboe, clarinet, bassoon, two horns, trombone, bells, and strings (violins, violas, cellos, and double basses).

Composition
The symphony has many influences including Civil War songs, dances, and general European classical music. It evokes country meetings during his childhood, when people gathered in fields to sing, preach, and listen. Ives was sentimentally nostalgic, glancing back as a modern composer at a nineteenth-century childhood of hymns, bells, and children's games throughout the three movements. The symphony is filled with complex harmonies and meters.

Premiere
Although there is no conclusive evidence that Ives and Gustav Mahler ever met, Mahler had seen the manuscript and talked of premiering the symphony with the New York Philharmonic.  There is also a story, which Ives put about, that Mahler took the score back to Europe, planning to conduct it there. Mahler's death in 1911 prevented any such performances, and the alleged score has never been located.

There was no further interest in the symphony until Lou Harrison, a great fan of Ives' music, finally conducted it in New York on 5 April 1946.  Bernard Herrmann, another composer who became a friend of Ives, conducted a CBS broadcast performance of the symphony soon after.

References
4. Zobel, Mark A. The Third Symphony of Charles Ives. Vol. 6 CMS Sourcebooks in American Music. Ed. Michael Budds. New York: Pendragon Press, 2009.

External links

Pulitzer Prize for Music-winning works
Symphonies by Charles Ives
1910 compositions